Ramli Ahmad (12 October 1956 – 16 November 2002) was a Malaysian sprinter. He competed in the men's 100 metres at the 1976 Summer Olympics.

References

1956 births
2002 deaths
Athletes (track and field) at the 1976 Summer Olympics
Malaysian male sprinters
Olympic athletes of Malaysia
Southeast Asian Games medalists in athletics
Place of birth missing
Southeast Asian Games bronze medalists for Malaysia
Competitors at the 1977 Southeast Asian Games